Sediliopsis incilifera is an extinct species of sea snail, a marine gastropod mollusk in the family Pseudomelatomidae, the turrids and allies.

Description
The length of the shell attains 16 mm.

Distribution
Fossils of this species were found in Miocene strata of Maryland, USA; age range: 11.608 to 5.332 Ma.

References

 E. J. Petuch. 1988. Neogene History of Tropical American Mollusks 1-217

External links
 Don I. Tippett, Taxonomic notes on the western Atlantic Turridae (Gastropoda: Conoidea); the Nautilus v. 109 (1995-1996)
 E. Petuch, Cenozoic Seas: The View From Eastern North America

incilifera
Gastropods described in 1830